Ryan Watson (born 2 February 1993) is an English actor and voice actor. He is best known for his role as the title character Bernard in the remake of Bernard's Watch from 2004-05.

In 2006, he performed at the Royal National Theatre as Andrea Sarti in David Hare's adaptation of The Life Of Galileo.

Watson has also recently voiced several characters for BBC Radio 4. He played the part of Prince Edward in the radio adaptation of Marlowe's Edward II for BBC Radio 3 in September 2009.

Television

Radio

Theatre

References

External links 

1993 births
Living people
English male television actors
English male radio actors
English male stage actors